A blind nut may refer to:

Rivet nut, a nut designed to be used on sheet metal
T-nut, a nut designed be used in wood